Lironne Bar-Sade has been the Israeli Ambassador to Ireland since August 2021 and from 2015-2019, Ambassador to Latvia.

Biography
Lironne Bar-Sade was born in Rhodesia. She migrated to Israel in 1961. She earned a bachelor's degree in Hebrew and English literature (1983) and a master's degree in Jewish literature (1985) from Hebrew University of Jerusalem and graduated the cadets' course of the Israeli Ministry of Foreign Affairs in 1992.

Before joining the Foreign Service, Bar-Sade worked as an editor at KANAH Publications.

References

External links
Israeli ambassador accuses some TDs of spewing ‘hate’ towards Jewish state

Israeli women ambassadors
Ambassadors of Israel to Latvia
Hebrew University of Jerusalem alumni
Immigrants to Israel
Israeli editors
Israeli women editors
1959 births
Living people
Rhodesian Jews
Ambassadors of Israel to Ireland